Mallu Singh is a 2012 Indian Malayalam-language action comedy film written by Sethu and directed by Vysakh. The film stars Unni Mukundan, Kunchacko Boban, Biju Menon Manoj K. Jayan and Samvrutha Sunil. The film is credited as 50th film of Kunchacko Boban.

Plot
 
The movie begins in a district court of Palakkad. Ananthan Suresh Krishna waits for a verdict regarding the heir of an isolated land. The lawyer informs Ananthan that the verdict has been postponed.

Ananthan threatens Ani (Kunchacko Boban) and his younger sister Ashwathi (Samvritha Sunil) as they too are competing for the land. Ani wants to find Hari (Unni Mukundan), who was his cousin and childhood friend. Hari has been missing for seven years. He finds his grandmother in tears most of the time and watching her, he decides that he must reach Hari somehow. For many years Ani has been searching for Hari. So when Ani recognizes Hari in a TV program featuring Punjab, he sets forth to Punjab with great expectations of finding Hari.

In Punjab, he arrives in Mallu Street and finds Karthikeyan (Biju Menon) and Pappan (Manoj K Jayan). When they both learn that Ani has come in search of Hari, they ask about the story of Hari.

In Kerala, Hari wins a Kabbadi match and from then on, all of the villagers are very fond of him. One day, as Valiyampattu Raghavan Nair (Siddique), Ani's father and Hari's maternal uncle, is carrying on with his harvest festival, Govindan Kutty (Sai Kumar) and Ananthan who have a grudge against Raghavan Nair's family arrive at Raghavan Nair's shop. When Ananthan kicks a plate containing groceries, Hari arrives at the spot. Govindan says that Raghavan Nair and Ani have come to seize Hari's property. When Hari ignores, Govindan Kutty warns Hari to be aware of Raghavan Nair as one day Hari will be kicked out him. 

Hari decides to organise a new business in the hope to earn some money but in vain. Ani decides to fix Hari's marriage with Aswathi in order to unite Hari and Raghavan Nair. Knowing this, Raghavan Nair slaps Ani for thinking of a proposal for Aswathi with a jobless man. To get rid of burdens and humiliations, Hari decides to leave the village for peace and promises a return after a long time. On his way, he hears the screaming of Raghavan Nair. When he is about to help him, Govindan Kutty and Ananthan accuse Hari for killing his own uncle for wealth. From then on, Hari was never seen.

On hearing the story, Karthi and Pappan decide to help Ani find Hari and resolve his issues in Kerala. Still, they are sure that it might not be Hari they knew as he was a proper Sikh.

One day, Ani finds Hari fighting a few Sardar students for flirting with his sisters. Keen on seeing him, Ani enthusiastically calls Hari loudly, expecting to be recognised. But he identifies himself as Harinder Singh, sporting a beard and a turban. Even in his behaviour, Harinder Singh looks like a typical Punjabi. Ani discovers that Hari is Mallu Singh.

Ani wants to make sure about Hari's identity and decides to stay there for a long period. However, Karthi and Pappan help Ani. Together, the three go in search of proof to make sure that 'Mallu Singh' is Hari. Somewhere along the line, Susheelan Suraj Venjaramood joins the three making the situation worse. Susheelan came to Punjab to start a hair cutting salon but on finding that no one in Punjab cuts hair, took up cycle repair as his occupation for survival.

Ani tries all his luck to make Hari reveal the truth. He even brings Ashwathi to Punjab. Even after Harinder Singh's marriage gets fixed with Ashwathi, Hari refuses to admit that he is Hari. Disheartened, Ani says that he is not ready for the marriage and they plan to go back to Kerala. Hari comes to their room and reveals the truth to them. 

Disheartened by seeing his uncle die, Hari makes way through the road where the real Harinder Singh (Asif Ali) gives him a lift in his truck. On the way, Harinder reveals that he had left his home since he was a child and he also happily tells that he is going to meet his family after a long gap in Punjab.
As fate would have it, Harinder hands over the truck to Hari and takes rest which was sleepily rode by him which creates an accident in which the real Harinder gets killed. Upon witnessing two deaths, shocked and frustrated, he reaches Punjab only to witness Harinder's family being harassed by goons. He rescues them and becomes their saviour. Harinder's father considers him as his own son and from then on Hari changes his identity to Mallu Singh. He says that he is helpless and has to be Mallu Singh for the rest of his life. But Harinder Singh's father hears this and says that Hari can live with them as their son but he has to go back to Kerala and settle his family problems.

In Kerala, Ananthan plans the measurement of the land kept for the verdict. There's just one day left for the final verdict regarding the case and Ananthan confidently says that no one from the Valiyampattu family would come to take back the land as Raghavan Nair had been killed and Hari and Ani had also escaped and are nowhere to be seen in the country. Then Hari, Ani, Karthi and Pappan show up on the spot and fight Ananthan and his brothers to recover their land and to avenge the death of Raghavan Nair. Once everything is settled, they move back to Punjab and get married to their respective brides.

Cast

Unni Mukundan as Hari Narayanan / Harinder Singh aka Mallu Singh (voice over by Mithun Ramesh)
Kunchako Boban as Valiyampattu Aniyan (Ani)
Biju Menon as Karthikeyan
Manoj K. Jayan as Pappan
Suraj Venjarammoodu as Susheelan
Samvrutha Sunil as Aswathy (Achu)
Rupa Manjari as Pooja
Meera Nandan as Neethu
Aparna Nair as Shwetha
Shaalin Zoya as Nithya
Siddique as Valiyampattu Raghavan Nair
Sai Kumar as Govindan Kutty
Suresh Krishna as Ananthan
Shavinder Mahal as Harinder's father
Geetha as Harinder's mother
Ganapathi S Poduval as young Hari
Mamukkoya as Ramankutty
Sreejith Ravi as Chandrappan, Ananthan's younger brother
Joju George as Bhaskaran, Ananthan's younger brother
Kalasala Babu as Chellappan, Lawyer
Lakshmi Krishna Moorthy as the grandmother
Vysakh as a Singh in the truck (special appearance)
Udayakrishna as a Singh in the truck (special appearance)
Asif Ali as the original Harinder Singh (special appearance)
Hanzil Hydar Ali as Kuttoos (special appearance)
Esther Anil as young Nithya

Critical reception
The Times of India gave it a three stars out of five. Sify.com stated "Mallu Singh could be appealing in parts for those viewers who are there just for fun, without much logic. For the rest, here is one movie with lots of styles but no substance at all. Decide the category to which you belong, before heading for this one". Rediff.com gave a rating of 3/5, and stated that Mallu Singh is entertaining.

Box office
The film was a commercial success and ran over 100 days.

Soundtrack

The soundtrack of the film was composed by M. Jayachandran with lyrics penned by Murukan Kattakada and Rajeev Alunkal.
The background score was composed by Gopi Sundar.

References

External links

2010s Malayalam-language films
2012 action comedy films
Indian action comedy films
Films scored by M. Jayachandran
Films shot in Punjab, India
Films shot in Palakkad
Films shot in Ottapalam
Films directed by Vysakh
2012 comedy films